The United States participated in the 2011 Parapan American Games.

Medalists

Archery

The United States sent six male and three female athletes to compete.

Athletics

The United States sent 29 male and 15 female athletes to compete.

Boccia

The United States sent nine male athletes and one female athlete to compete.

Cycling

The United States sent seventeen male and thirteen female athletes to compete. Ten male and seven female athletes competed in the road cycling tournament, while seven male and six female athletes competed in the track cycling tournament.

Road
Men

Women

Mixed

Track
Men

Women

Key:
Q – qualified to gold medal race
q – qualified to bronze medal race
OVL – overlapped

Goalball

The United States sent two teams of six athletes each to compete in the men's and women's tournaments.

Men

Women

Judo

The United States sent seven male and five female athletes to compete.

Men

Women

Powerlifting

The United States sent three male and three female athletes to compete.

Sitting volleyball

The United States sent a team of ten athletes to compete.

Swimming

The United States sent five male and eighteen female swimmers to compete.

Men

Women

Table tennis

The United States sent eight male and four female table tennis players to compete.

Men

Women

Wheelchair basketball

The United States sent a team of twelve male athletes and a team of eleven female athletes to compete in the men's and women's tournaments.

Men

Women

Wheelchair tennis

The United States sent two male and two female athletes to compete.

Men

Nations at the 2011 Parapan American Games
2011 in American sports